Venom exonuclease (venom phosphodiesterase) is an enzyme. This enzyme catalyses the following chemical reaction

Exonucleolytic cleavage in the 3'- to 5'- direction to yield nucleoside 5'-phosphates (exonuclease type a)

This enzyme has preference for single-stranded substrate.

References

External links 
 

EC 3.1.15